Cardinal High School is a public high school in Middlefield, Ohio, United States. Students come from Middlefield village, Middlefield township, and the townships of Parkman and Huntsburg.

Athletics

Ohio High School Athletic Association State Championships

 Wrestling (State Champions) – 1978

Other sports accomplishments
 Baseball (State Runner Up) – 1996
 Cross Country (4th in State) – 2003
 Cross Country (State Runner Up) – 2004

External links
 Cardinal High School Website
 Ohio High School Athletic Association

Notes and references

High schools in Geauga County, Ohio
Public high schools in Ohio